Hyphomicrobium aestuarii is a Gram-negative bacteria from the genus of Hyphomicrobium.

References

Hyphomicrobiales
Bacteria described in 1989